The 1967 NCAA Men's University Division Ice Hockey Tournament was the culmination of the 1966–67 NCAA University Division men's ice hockey season, the 20th such tournament in NCAA history. It was held between March 16 and 18, 1967, and concluded with Cornell defeating Boston University 4-1. All games were played at the Onondaga County War Memorial in Syracuse, New York.

This was the first championship for an eastern team since 1954 and the first time since 1949 that both finalists were from the east.

Qualifying teams
Four teams qualified for the tournament, two each from the eastern and western regions. The ECAC tournament champion and the two WCHA tournament co-champions received automatic bids into the tournament. An at-large bid was offered to a second eastern team based upon both their ECAC tournament finish as well as their regular season record.

Format
Despite winning the tournament the ECAC champion was not seeded as the top eastern team; this occurred because the at-large team had a better conference regular season record. The WCHA co-champion with the better regular season record was given the top western seed. The second eastern seed was slotted to play the top western seed and vice versa. All games were played at the Onondaga County War Memorial. All matches were Single-game eliminations with the semifinal winners advancing to the national championship game and the losers playing in a consolation game.

Bracket

Note: * denotes overtime period(s)

Semifinals

(W1) North Dakota vs. (E2) Cornell

(E1) Boston University vs. (W2) Michigan State

Consolation Game

(W1) North Dakota vs. (W2) Michigan State

National Championship

(E1) Boston University vs. (E2) Cornell

All-Tournament team

First Team
G: Ken Dryden (Cornell)
D: Harry Orr (Cornell)
D: Skip Stanowski* (Cornell)
F: Mike Doran (Cornell)
F: Tom Mikkola (Michigan State)
F: Jim Quinn (Boston University)
* Most Outstanding Player(s)

Second Team
G: Wayne Ryan (Boston University)
D: Pete McLachlan (Boston University)
D: Brian Gilmour (Boston University)
F: Doug Ferguson (Cornell)
F: Dave Ferguson (Cornell)
F: Brian McAndrew (Michigan State)

References

Tournament
NCAA Division I men's ice hockey tournament
NCAA University Division Men's Ice Hockey Tournament
NCAA University Division Men's Ice Hockey Tournament
Ice hockey in Syracuse, New York
Sports competitions in Syracuse, New York
College sports tournaments in New York (state)